Trustom Pond is a closed lagoon in South Kingstown, Washington County, Rhode Island, United States. It is one of nine coastal lagoons (referred to as "salt ponds" by locals) in southern Rhode Island. It is non-tidal, except when breached by storms. No streams flow into the pond, though a nearby stream "captures water that otherwise would have flowed to Trustom Pond".

Trustom Pond National Wildlife Refuge is a National Wildlife Refuge, inhabited by an estimated 300 species of birds, as well as some 40 species of mammals and 20 species of reptiles and amphibians. As such, it is a popular bird-watching destination. The piping plover inhabits the site. In 2010, the wildlife refuge received approximately 70,000 visitors. Trustom Pond NWR includes  of nature trails. Habitat areas within Trustom Pond NWR include fields, shrubland, woodland, freshwater pond, saltwater ponds, beaches, and sand dunes. Wildlife managers create breachways to the Block Island Sound, lowering water levels and creating mudflats which become feeding areas for waders.

See also

List of lakes in Rhode Island
Geography of Rhode Island

References

External links

 Trustom Pond National Wildlife Refuge
 Trustom Pond map

Landforms of Washington County, Rhode Island
Lagoons of Washington County, Rhode Island
Saline lakes of the United States
National Wildlife Refuges in Rhode Island
South Kingstown, Rhode Island
Protected areas of Washington County, Rhode Island
Wetlands of Rhode Island
Protected areas established in 1987
1987 establishments in Rhode Island